New Market Presbyterian Church is a historic church at 1000 W. Old Andrew Johnson Hwy in New Market, Tennessee.

The congregation was formed September 10, 1826, as an off-split from Hopewell Presbyterian Church in Dandridge.

The church building was built in 1885 and added to the National Register of Historic Places in 1998.

References

1826 establishments in Tennessee
19th-century Presbyterian church buildings in the United States
Buildings and structures in Jefferson County, Tennessee
Gothic Revival church buildings in Tennessee
Presbyterian churches in Tennessee
Churches on the National Register of Historic Places in Tennessee
Churches completed in 1885
Religious organizations established in 1826
New Market, Tennessee
National Register of Historic Places in Jefferson County, Tennessee